Minuscule 694 (in the Gregory-Aland numbering), ε502 (von Soden), is a Greek–Latin diglot minuscule manuscript of the New Testament, on paper. Palaeographically it has been assigned to the 15th century. The manuscript has complex contents. Scrivener labelled it by 598e.

Description 

The codex contains the text of the four Gospels on 208 paper leaves (size ). The text is written in two columns per page, 33-34 lines per page.

There are no divisions according to the Ammonian Sections.

It contains lectionary markings, incipits,  (lessons), Synaxarion, Menologion, and subscriptions at the end.

Text 

The Greek text of the codex is a representative of the Byzantine text-type. Hermann von Soden classified it to the textual family Kr.  Kurt Aland placed it in Category V.

According to the Claremont Profile Method it represents textual family Kr in Luke 1, Luke 10, and Luke 20.

History 

Scrivener and Gregory dated the manuscript to the 15th century. Currently the manuscript is dated by the INTF to the 15th century.

The manuscript was bought at Puttick's in 1861.

It was added to the list of New Testament manuscript by Scrivener (598) and Gregory (694).

It was examined by S. T. Bloomfield and Dean Burgon. Gregory saw the manuscript in 1883.

The manuscript is currently housed at the British Library (Add MS 24112) in London.

See also 

 List of New Testament minuscules
 Biblical manuscript
 Textual criticism

References

Further reading 

 S. T. Bloomfield, Critical Annotations: Additional and Supplementary on the New Testament (1860).

Greek New Testament minuscules
15th-century biblical manuscripts
British Library additional manuscripts